The Women's madison competition at the 2022 UCI Track Cycling World Championships was held on 15 October 2022.

Results
The race was started at 18:10.

References

Women's madison